Mount Washington Alpine Resort is a year-round recreation destination located on Vancouver Island, British Columbia, Canada. Adjacent to Strathcona Provincial Park, BC's oldest provincial park, Mt. Washington is the Island’s only full-service ski and summer resort hosting over 250,000 visits per year. Situated more than one kilometer above sea level, the resort overlooks the Comox Valley, the Strait of Georgia, the Coast Mountains, and the Beaufort Range.

In the winter, guests access over 688 hectares (1,700 acres) and 507 vertical metres (1,663 ft) of alpine terrain, 55 km (34 mi) of cross-country skiing and 25 km (16 mi) of snowshoeing trails along with a dedicated Nordic lodge, Tube Park and Fat Bike trails. The resort receives some of the largest snowfall in North America at over 11 metres (36 ft) annually on average.

Summer features include a 2.3 km (1.5 mi) ZipTour zip line, lift-accessed mountain biking, quad bungy trampoline, chairlift rides, disc golf, miniature golf, boardwalk chess and checkers, shopping, and dining.

History
Mt. Washington Alpine Resort was opened in 1979 by two Campbell River businessmen, Henry Norie and Alex Linton. The idea first started in 1975 when Linton—an avid skier and local businessman from Campbell River—marvelled at the height and snowpack of Mt. Washington. Together with his friend, Norie, who had a helicopter, the two surveyed the mountain. Sixteen months later, they purchased the land from the forestry company Crown Zellerbach, and hired mountain resort planning company, Ecosign, to master-plan the resort, with construction beginning in 1977. Mt. Washington, like Whistler Blackcomb, was one of the first master-planned resorts for the province of British Columbia.

In 1989, the founders sold their interests to George Stuart and a group of shareholders who invested into the resort by upgrading lifts, adding terrain and base area buildings, and investing in infrastructure and roads. In 2015, Stuart’s group sold the resort and most of the developable land near the base area to a Canadian subsidiary of Pacific Group Resorts, Inc.

Transportation

 Road: The resort is located at #1 Strathcona Parkway, Mt.  Washington, BC, approximately a 15-minute drive from the Inland Island Highway, British Columbia Highway 19. Various bus services connect to Courtenay, and during the winter season, the resort operates a ski bus shuttle service with stops in Courtenay.
 Sea: BC Ferries offers daily ferry connections from Vancouver to Nanaimo, as well as from Powell River to Comox.
 Air: The Comox Valley Airport (YQQ) and Campbell River Airport (YBL) on Vancouver Island are the closest to Mt.  Washington, approximately a 40-minute drive from either.

Etymology
Mt. Washington is named after John Washington (Royal Navy officer). For several years Washington was assistant to Sir Francis Beaufort, after whom the range of mountains down the centre of Vancouver Island is named.

References

External links

Pacific Group Resorts, Inc.
Mt. Washington Ski Patrol Association
Vancouver Island Society for Adaptive Snowsports (VISAS)

Ski areas and resorts in British Columbia
Washington Alpine Resort